Quesnel was a sternwheeler first launched in May 1909 at Quesnel, British Columbia to serve the Soda Creek to Fort George route of the upper Fraser River.

Career
Originally named City of Quesnel, she was truly a home town product: owned by Telesphore Marion, a local merchant, built by local carpenter, John Strand and piloted by local man, Captain Donald Arthur Foster. However, on her launch day, it was discovered that she rode too low in the water and that her hull needed to be lengthened. Shipbuilder Donald McPhee was already in town, having just completed the construction of another sternwheeler, the Nechacco. McPhee was hired to do the work and City of Quesnel was rebuilt and relaunched under the name Quesnel on September 2.

Among the first of the upper Fraser River vessels built during the era of rail construction, she would also be the last. She served the district for six seasons, until she was retired in the spring of 1915. By then, several factors had devastated the local economy and steamer service wasn't as profitable as it had been previously. The Grand Trunk Pacific Railway was completed, and the outbreak of the Great War had caused an abrupt halt to the construction of the promised Pacific Great Eastern Railway which had been under construction from Fort George south since early 1914.

Sinking

In April 1921, Captain Foster, in partnership with WH Matheson, relaunched Quesnel, intending to resume the local service that BC Express and BX had recently abandoned. The local farmers, settlers and miners, especially those between Quesnel and Fort George, applauded her return, as it was a financial hardship for them to be without steamer service, because the rates on other shipping methods were higher.

Quesnel only worked for three weeks before she was wrecked in the Fort George Canyon on May 13. Captain Foster and Matheson recovered her cargo, which consisted of, among other things, a Ford automobile and 100 barrels of beer, and attempted to salvage her, but during the operation, she broke free from the rock she was caught on and sank and was never recovered. The era of river navigation on the upper Fraser was over.

See also
 Steamboats of the Upper Fraser River in British Columbia
 List of ships in British Columbia

Notes

References and further reading
 
 
 

Paddle steamers of British Columbia
Shipwrecks in the British Columbia Interior
Shipwrecks in rivers
1909 ships